Isabelle is a 2018 Canadian-American horror film directed by Robert Heydon and starring Adam Brody and Amanda Crew.

Plot 
A young couple's dream of starting a family is shattered as they descend into the depths of paranoia and must fight to survive an evil presence that wants nothing more than their own lives.

Cast

Adam Brody as Matt Kane
Amanda Crew as Larissa Kane
Zoe Belkin as Isabelle Pelway
Mark Winnick as Officer Steve Murray
Sheila McCarthy as Ann Pelway
Booth Savage as Clifford Kane
Dayo Ade as Father Lopez
Michael Miranda as Pedro Salazar
Allison Brooks as Ruth Stanton
Krista Bridges as Jessica
David Tompa as Dr. Karl Neidorf
Zoe Doyle as Dr. Phoebe Chan
John Healy as Det. John Smith

Release
The film had its worldwide premiere at the Busan International Film Festival in October 2018.  Then it was released in limited theaters and video-on-demand on May 24, 2019.

Reception

References

External links
 
 
 

American horror films
Canadian horror films
English-language Canadian films
2018 films
2018 horror films
Films scored by Mark Korven
Vertical Entertainment films
2010s English-language films
2010s American films
2010s Canadian films